Jae-won is a Korean unisex given name. Its meaning differs based on the hanja used to write each syllable of the name. There are 26 hanja with the reading "jae" and 46 hanja with the reading "won" on the South Korean government's official list of hanja which may be registered for use in given names.

People with this name include:

Entertainers
Lee Jae-won (singer) (born 1980), South Korean actor and singer
Kim Jaewon (born 1981), South Korean actor
One (rapper) (born Jung Jae-won, 1994), South Korean rapper

Sportspeople
An Jae-won (born 1948), South Korean wrestler 
Kang Jae-won (born 1965), South Korean male handball player
Jeong Jae-won (born 1969), South Korean male rower
Sim Jae-won (born 1977), South Korean male football right back
Hwang Jae-won (born 1981), South Korean male football defender
Lee Jae-won (footballer, born 1983) (born 1983), South Korean male football forward (K-League 1)
Heo Jae-won (born 1984), South Korean male football player 
Oh Jae-won (born 1965), South Korean baseball male infielder
Lee Jae-won (baseball) (born 1988), South Korean male baseball catcher
Lee Jae-won (footballer, born 1992), South Korean male football forward (J3 League)
Chung Jae-won (born 2001), South Korean speed skater

Others
Jae Won Lee, South Korean-born American female ceramic artist

See also
List of Korean given names

References

Korean unisex given names